The following is a list of all eighty-four (84) members of the XIII Legislative Assembly of El Salvador (2021–2024). The session began on 1 May 2021 and will end on 1 May 2024. The list is ordered alphabetically by departments.

Ahuachapán 

The department of Ahuachapán has four (4) deputies in the Legislative Assembly.

Political affiliations:

Cabañas 

The department of Cabañas has three (3) deputies in the Legislative Assembly.

Political affiliations:

Chalatenango 

The department of Chalatenango has three (3) deputies in the Legislative Assembly.

Political affiliations:

Cuscatlán 

The department of Cuscatlán has three (3) deputies in the Legislative Assembly.

Political affiliations:

La Libertad 

The department of La Libertad has ten (10) deputies in the Legislative Assembly.

Political affiliations:

La Paz 

The department of La Paz has four (4) deputies in the Legislative Assembly.

Political affiliations:

La Unión 

The department of La Unión has three (3) deputies in the Legislative Assembly.

Political affiliations:

Morazán 

The department of Morazán has three (3) deputies in the Legislative Assembly.

Political affiliations:

San Miguel 

The department of San Miguel has six (6) deputies in the Legislative Assembly.

Political affiliations:

San Salvador 

The department of San Salvador has twenty-four (24) deputies in the Legislative Assembly.

Political affiliations:

San Vicente 

The department of San Vicente has three (3) deputies in the Legislative Assembly.

Political affiliations:

Santa Ana 

The department of Santa Ana has seven (7) deputies in the Legislative Assembly.

Political affiliations:

Sonsonate 

The department of Sonsonate has six (6) deputies in the Legislative Assembly.

Political affiliations:

Usulután 

The department of Usulután has five (5) deputies in the Legislative Assembly.

Political affiliations:

Notes

Bibliography

External links 

Official website of the Legislative Assembly

Politics of El Salvador
Government of El Salvador
El Salvador